Macrobathra heterocera is a moth in the family Cosmopterigidae. It was described by Oswald Bertram Lower in 1894. It is found in Australia, where it has been recorded from Tasmania.

References

Macrobathra
Moths described in 1894